François Tallement (1620, La Rochelle – 6 May 1693, Paris) was a French churchman and translator. He is often known as l'Aîné (the Elder) to distinguish him from his cousin Paul Tallement le Jeune.

Biography
The brother of Gédéon Tallemant des Réaux, he was almoner to Louis XIV for 24 years, then first almoner to Madame. He was elected a member of the Académie française in 1651. Paul Pellisson said of him "He had a mind, he did not even miss knowing.", whilst one historian in the Académie stated:

Works
We have two translations by him (adjudged mediocre by his contemporaries):
Vies des hommes illustres from Plutarch, in six volumes (1663–65)
Histoire de Venise by Giovan Battista Nani, in 4 volumes (1689)
His other works are six discourses he made in the Académie. In one of these he declares:

References

External links
Académie française

1620 births
1693 deaths
Greek–French translators
Italian–French translators
Members of the Académie Française
17th-century French translators